Janczewo may refer to the following places:
Janczewo, Lubusz Voivodeship (west Poland)
Janczewo, Gmina Jedwabne in Podlaskie Voivodeship (north-east Poland)
Janczewo, Gmina Wizna in Podlaskie Voivodeship (north-east Poland)